The 2018 Singapore Sevens was the eighth tournament of the 2017–18 World Rugby Sevens Series. The tournament was played on 28–29 April 2018 at the National Stadium in Singapore.

Format
Sixteen teams are drawn into four pools of four teams each. Each team plays all the others in their pool once. The top two teams from each pool advance to the Cup quarter finals. The bottom two teams from each group advance to the Challenge Trophy quarter finals.

Teams
The teams for the 2018 Singapore Sevens were:

Pool stage
All times in Singapore Standard Time (UTC+08:00). The games as scheduled are as follows:

Pool A

Pool B

Pool C

Pool D

Knockout stage

13th place

Challenge Trophy

5th place

Cup

Tournament placings

Source: World Rugby

Players

Scoring leaders

Source: World Rugby

Dream Team
The following seven players were selected to the tournament Dream Team at the conclusion of the tournament:

References

External links
 Tournament Page

Singapore Sevens
Singapore
2018 in Singaporean sport
April 2018 sports events in Asia